Nenad Manojlović (25 March 1954 – 24 November 2014) was a Yugoslav and Serbian water polo player and manager. As manager of Serbia and Montenegro men's national water polo team (formerly the FR Yugoslavia men's national water polo team), Manojlović won silver and bronze medals in the Summer Olympics in Athens 2004 and Sydney 2000, silver and bronze medals in the World Championships 2001 in Fukuoka and 2003 in Barcelona and gold medals in the European championships 2001 in Budapest and 2003 in Kranj.

Manojlović died on 24 November 2014, while being on the way to Sofia where he was to participate in the professional seminar.

References

External links

1954 births
2014 deaths
Sportspeople from Belgrade
Yugoslav male water polo players
Serbian male water polo players
Serbia and Montenegro water polo coaches
Serbian water polo coaches
Serbia and Montenegro men's national water polo team coaches
Water polo coaches at the 2000 Summer Olympics
Water polo coaches at the 2004 Summer Olympics